Alex Russell may refer to:

Alex Russell (actor) (born 1987), Australian actor
Alex Russell (footballer, born 1973), English footballer
Alex Russell (footballer, born 1944), English footballer for Southport FC
Alex Russell (footballer, born 1923), Northern Irish footballer for Linfield FC
Alex Russell (golfer) (1892–1961), Australian golfer and grazier
Alex Russell (born 2002), English cricketer for Northamptonshire CCC

See also
Alexander Russell (disambiguation)